Oliver St George (1661 – 15 April 1731) was an Irish politician.

The son of Sir Oliver St George, 1st Baronet and Olivia Beresford, he married Mary, daughter of Thomas Knox and  Mary  Bruce, in 1701.

He was elected to the Irish House of Commons for both Carrick and Dungannon in September 1703, and chose to sit for Carrick. In the next general election in November 1713 he was elected again for Dungannon, and sat there until his death. He was appointed to the Irish Privy Council on 9 October 1714.

References

1661 births
1731 deaths
Irish MPs 1703–1713
Irish MPs 1713–1714
Irish MPs 1715–1727
Irish MPs 1727–1760
Members of the Privy Council of Ireland
Younger sons of baronets
Members of the Parliament of Ireland (pre-1801) for County Leitrim constituencies
Members of the Parliament of Ireland (pre-1801) for County Tyrone constituencies